Jim Eadie (born 10 February 1968) is a Scottish politician who was the Scottish National Party (SNP) Member of the Scottish Parliament (MSP) for the Edinburgh Southern constituency 2011–2016. In 2021 he joined the Alba Party.

Early life
Eadie was born on 10 February 1968 in Glasgow, Scotland. He was educated at Waverley Secondary School and the University of Strathclyde.

Eadie worked for the Royal College of Nursing and Scottish Television, before becoming head of the Scottish branch of the Association of the British Pharmaceutical Industry (ABPI) in 2002. He left the ABPI in 2007 to start a healthcare consulting business.

Political career
Eadie contested the seat of Edinburgh Southern in the 2011 Scottish Parliament election, and defeated the Liberal Democrat incumbent Mike Pringle by a narrow margin of 693 votes. In the same election, he was the eleventh list candidate for the SNP in the Lothian region.

Eadie was one of seven LGBT MSPs during the 4th Scottish Parliament.

He was Convener of the Infrastructure and Capital Investment Committee 2014–2016.

He stood again in the Edinburgh Southern seat in 2016, but lost his seat to Daniel Johnson of the Labour Party.

He was selected to stand in the Edinburgh South constituency at the 2017 United Kingdom general election.

At the 2021 Scottish Parliament election, having left the SNP and joined the Alba Party, Eadie was nominated as the third-placed candidate on the Alba list in the Mid Scotland and Fife region. However, Alba won only 1.7% of the votes, and no seats.

References

External links 

 

1968 births
Living people
Alumni of the University of Strathclyde
Gay politicians
Politicians from Glasgow
Scottish National Party MSPs
Members of the Scottish Parliament 2011–2016
Members of the Scottish Parliament for Edinburgh constituencies
Alba Party politicians
LGBT members of the Scottish Parliament